Grethe is a given name. Notable people with the name include:

Grethe and Jørgen Ingmann, Danish singers and musicians
Grethe Fossli (born 1954), Norwegian politician for the Labour Party
Grethe Grünberg (born 1988), Estonian ice dancer
Grethe Gynnild Johnsen (born 1959), Norwegian journalist
Grethe Holmer (1924–2004), Danish actress
Grethe Ingmann (1938–1990), Danish singer
Grethe Kausland (1947–2007), Norwegian singer, performer and actress
Grethe Krogh (1928–2018), Danish organist and professor
May Grethe Lerum (born 1965), Norwegian novelist
Grethe Fenger Møller (born 1941), Danish politician
Grethe Nielsen (1926–), Danish sprinter
Grethe Philip (1916–2016), Danish politician
Grethe Rask (1930–1977), Danish physician and surgeon who practiced medicine in what was then known as Zaire
Grethe Rytter Hasle (born 1920), Norwegian planktologist
Grethe Sønck (1929–2010), Danish actress and singer
Grethe Thordahl (1926–2004), Danish stage and film actress
Grethe Weiser (1903–1970), German actress